Catarhoe rubidata, the ruddy carpet, is a moth of the family Geometridae. The species was first described by Michael Denis and Ignaz Schiffermüller in 1775. It is found in western Europe and the Iberian Peninsula and western Central Asia.

The wingspan is 26–31 mm. The forewings have a red-brown ground colour with a black and grey medial band. The hindwings are grey. Adults are on wing from May to August in two generations.

The larvae feed on Galium species. Larvae can be found in July and August. It overwinters as a pupa. The pupa is found under ground in a fortified cocoon.

SubspeciesCatarhoe rubidata rubidataCatarhoe rubidata fumata'' (Eversmann 1844)

External links

Ruddy carpet at UKMoths
Lepidoptera of Belgium
Lepiforum e.V.

Xanthorhoini
Moths of Europe
Moths of Asia
Taxa named by Michael Denis
Taxa named by Ignaz Schiffermüller